Mathias Berg Gjerstrøm (born 30 June 1997) is a Norwegian footballer who plays for Kongsvinger as a midfielder.

Career
Gjerstrøm spent his youth years at Nordstrand IF, and is considered one of the most talented young players in the country, having played for Norway's youth international teams since he was 14. In February 2013, he spent four days training with Manchester United.

Gjerstrøm was also a talented handball-player for Bækkelagets SK, with international matches for the Norwegian G-15 team, but decided to focus on football.

On 11 August 2013, Gjerstrøm signed for Norwegian Premier League champions Strømsgodset for an undisclosed sum.

Gjerstrøm made his debut for Strømsgodset in the 1-4 home loss against Brann on 13 September 2014.

On 31 March 2016 he was loaned to Kongsvinger. On 15 August 2018, Gjerstrøm was loaned out once again, this time to Notodden FK for the rest of the year.

Career statistics

Club

References

1997 births
Living people
Footballers from Oslo
Norwegian footballers
Strømsgodset Toppfotball players
Eliteserien players
Kongsvinger IL Toppfotball players
Norwegian First Division players
Notodden FK players
Association football midfielders
Norway youth international footballers